NGC 5408 is an irregular galaxy in the constellation Centaurus.  It was discovered by John Herschel on June 5, 1834.

Galaxy group information

NGC 5408 is located near the M83 Subgroup of the Centaurus A/M83 Group, a relatively nearby group of galaxies.  However, it is unclear as to whether NGC 5408 is part of the group.

References

External links

Irregular galaxies
Dwarf irregular galaxies
Dwarf barred irregular galaxies
Centaurus (constellation)
5408
50073
Virgo Supercluster